Dobrinka is a rural locality (a khutor) and the administrative center of Dobrisnkoye Rural Settlement, Surovikinsky District, Volgograd Oblast, Russia. The population was 754 as of 2010. There are 8 streets.

Geography 
Dobrinka is located on the bank of the Levaya Dobraya River, 40 km northeast of Surovikino (the district's administrative centre) by road. Lobakin is the nearest rural locality.

References 

Rural localities in Surovikinsky District
Don Host Oblast